The siege of Pondicherry (August – October 1748) was conducted by British forces against a French East India Company garrison under the command of Governor-General Joseph François Dupleix at the Indian port of Pondicherry.  The British siege strategy, conducted with inexperience in siege tactics by Admiral Edward Boscawen, was lifted with the arrival of monsoon rains, on 27 October 1748.  The siege was the last major action of the First Carnatic War, as the Indian theatre of the War of the Austrian Succession is sometimes known.

References

Dodwell, Dupleix and Clive

Sieges involving France
Battles involving Great Britain
Conflicts in 1748
1748 in India
First Carnatic War
History of Puducherry